Alec Nathan Wildenstein (August 5, 1940 – February 18, 2008) was a French-born American billionaire businessman, art dealer, racehorse owner, and breeder.

Biography
Born in Marseille, Wildenstein was raised in New York City where his family owned and operated an art gallery. In 1875, his great-grandfather founded a business dealing in art. His father, Daniel Wildenstein, was a distinguished scholar of impressionism whose career and dominant personality overshadowed his son's achievements. Daniel Wildenstein did not think a university education was necessary for his two sons to work in the family business. Daniel Wildenstein had a passion for racehorses, which his son shared.

Upon his father's death in 2001, Alec Wildenstein inherited half of a business empire estimated at US$10 billion and included what was believed to be the world's largest private collection of major works of art.

Horse racing
Alec Wildenstein enjoyed thoroughbreds for flat and steeplechase and standardbreds for harness racing. His Ecurie Wildenstein racing stable hired Élie Lellouche and Dominique Sepulchre to train his flat horses, and Jean-Paul Gallorini and Marcel Rolland for his steeplechase runners. Wildenstein raced a number of successful horses including:

 Bright Sky – won the Prix de Diane, Prix de l'Opéra
 Aquarelliste  – won Prix Vermeille, Prix de Diane, Prix Ganay
 Westerner –  won Ascot Gold Cup, Prix du Cadran, Prix Royal-Oak, 2004 & 2005 European Champion Stayer
 Vallée Enchantée – won the Hong Kong Vase

In 2004, Wildenstein's steeplechase runner, Kotkijet, owned in partnership with Jean-Pierre Dubois, won his second Grand Steeple-Chase de Paris.

Personal life
In 1977, his family purchased a 49% stake for Wildenstein in the first  Ol Jogi Ranch on the Laikipia District in Kenya. In 1985, the family acquired complete ownership. He met Jocelyne Périsset when she was a guest at Ol Jogi Ranch and they were married on April 30, 1978. They had a daughter, Diane, followed by a son, Alec. Jr. Their divorce proceedings between 1997 and 1999 gained wide media coverage for revelations about the couple's extravagant spending habits and the pressure he put on Jocelyn Wildenstein to undergo plastic surgery.

References

1940 births
2008 deaths
Deaths from prostate cancer
French art dealers
French racehorse owners and breeders
20th-century French Jews
Sportspeople from Marseille
Deaths from cancer in France
Alec
French billionaires